The North American Orienteering Championships (NAOC) is an biannual orienteering event organized by the International Orienteering Federation.

History
Originally, the North American Orienteering Championships consisted of just two forest races. The competition was held in odd-numbered years until 1977, after which it changed to even numbered years starting in 1980. A sprint race was added to the program in 2006. The event's location always alternates between Canada and the United States.

The NAOC has been held in conjunction with other orienteering competitions such as the Canadian Orienteering Championships (1990, 1998, 2018, 2024) and the Asia-Pacific Orienteering Championships (1990, 2002).

Competition format
The current championship events are a long distance, middle distance, sprint distance, and either a forest relay or sprint relay. The events can take place in any order.

Venues

Winning teams

References

External links
 International Orienteering Federation

1971 establishments in Canada
Biennial sporting events
International Orienteering Federation
Orienteering in the United States
Outdoor recreation organizations
Orienteering competitions
Recurring sporting events established in 1971
Sports competitions in Canada
Sports competitions in the United States